Copelatus vagestriatus is a species of diving beetle. It is part of the subfamily Copelatinae in the family Dytiscidae. It was described by Zimmermann in 1919.

References

vagestriatus